Howard Waldrop (born September 15, 1946) is a science fiction author who works primarily in short fiction. He received the World Fantasy Award for Life Achievement in 2021.

Personal life 

Though born in Houston, Mississippi, Waldrop has spent most of his life in Texas. He moved to Washington state for several years, but has since returned to Austin. He is an avid fly fisherman. He is a member of the Turkey City Writer's Workshop, has attended the Rio Hondo Writing Workshop, and has taught at the Clarion Workshop.

Professional life
He is a frequent attendee of ArmadilloCon, the local science fiction convention held annually in Austin. He was the Toastmaster at the first ArmadilloCon (1979) and again at #29 in 2007; he was Guest of Honor at ArmadilloCon 5 (1983).

Waldrop was one of three writer Guests of Honor at the 1995 World Fantasy Convention held in Baltimore and at Readercon 15 held in Burlington, Massachusetts, in 2003.

Waldrop was Professional Writer Guest of Honor at Loscon 46 in Los Angeles, California, in 2019.

In 2004 he started writing movie reviews with Lawrence Person for Locus Online.

Style

Waldrop's stories combine elements such as alternative history, American popular culture, the American South, old movies (and character actors), classical mythology, and rock 'n' roll music. His style is sometimes obscure or elliptical: Night of the Cooters is a pastiche of H. G. Wells' The War of the Worlds told from the perspective of a small town Texas sheriff (a homage to Slim Pickens) who faces a Martian cylinder crashing down near his town; "Heirs of the Perisphere" involves robotic Disney characters waking up in the far future; "Fin de Cyclé" describes the Dreyfus affair from the perspective of bicycle enthusiasts.

Waldrop's work is frequently out-of-print, though still available for sale on-line; several of his books have been reprinted in omnibus editions.

Several of his stories have been nominated for the genre's awards; "The Ugly Chickens" — about the extinction of the dodo — won a Nebula Award for best novelette in 1980, and also a World Fantasy Award for Short Fiction in 1981; this is perhaps his best known work. In 2021, he won the World Fantasy Award for Life Achievement.

Bibliography

Novels & novellas 
The Texas-Israeli War: 1999 (with Jake Saunders, 1974) (Ballantine mass market, 1986)
Them Bones (Ace, 1984)
A Dozen Tough Jobs (novella) (Mark V Ziesing hardcover, 1989)
The Search for Tom Purdue (announced)
The Moone World (announced)

Short story collections
Howard Who? (Doubleday hardcover, 1986) (2006 trade paperback reprint from Small Beer Press)
All About Strange Monsters of the Recent Past (Ursus Imprints, signed/numbered/slipcased hardcover, 1987), (Ace mass market, 1991); mass-market UK edition reprinted under the title Strange Things In Close-Up, 1991
Night of the Cooters: More Neat Stories (Zeising/Ursus Imprints hardcover, 1990) (Ace mass market, 1993)
Going Home Again (Eidolon hardcover, 1997)
Dream Factories and Radio Pictures (e-book, 2001 at http://www.electricstory.com; printed trade paperback from Wheatland Press, 2003)
Custer's Last Jump and Other Collaborations (Golden Gryphon hardcover, 2003) (includes Waldrop's collaborations with Steven Utley, Bruce Sterling, Leigh Kennedy, George R. R. Martin, and others.)
Heart of Whitenesse (Subterranean Press, hardcover, 2005)
Things Will Never be the Same: Selected Short Fiction 1980-2005 ("best of" collection from Old Earth Books, 2007, trade paperback;  for 300-copy limited edition hardcover)
Other Worlds, Better Lives: Selected Long Fiction 1989-2003 (Old Earth Books, 2008, trade paperback;  for 300-copy signed/limited edition hardcover)
Horse of A Different Color: Selected Stories (2008-2013) Small Beer Press trade paperback)

Short stories
"Thirty Minutes Over Broadway!" lead off story in Wild Cards I: Wild Cards, Bantam, 1986 (multiple volume ongoing series currently in print from Tor Books.)
"Thin, On the Ground" in Cross Plains Universe, MonkeyBrain Books, 2006.
"The Dead Sea-Bottom Scrolls" in Old Mars (anthology), Tor Books, 2013. Nominated for a Locus Award.
"Ike at the Mike" (Omni, June 1982)

Chapbooks
The Soul-Catcher (self-published, 1967)
You Could Go Home Again (Cheap Street signed/numbered/tray cased very limited hardcover edition, 1993)
Custer's Last Jump (with Steven Utley) (Ticonderoga Publications, 1996)
Flying Saucer Rock and Roll (Cheap Street signed/numbered tray cased very limited hardcover edition, 2001)
A Better World's in Birth! (Golden Gryphon, 2003)
The Horse of a Different Color (You Rode In On)/The King of Where-I-Go (WSFA, 2006); saddle-stitched trade paperback given out to members of the 2005 Capclave, though not printed in time to be distributed there (not available/sold separately after publication)

References

External links 
 
 A Woodsman's Guide to Howard Waldrop 
 The Ugly Chickens (online at lexal.net)
 Howard Waldrop stories online

1946 births
Living people
20th-century American novelists
American male novelists
American science fiction writers
American alternate history writers
Nebula Award winners
World Fantasy Award-winning writers
Novelists from Texas
American male short story writers
20th-century American short story writers
21st-century American short story writers
People from Houston, Mississippi
20th-century American male writers
21st-century American male writers